A queen regnant (plural: queens regnant) is a female monarch, equivalent in rank and title to a king, who reigns suo jure (in her own right) over a realm known as a "kingdom"; as opposed to a queen consort, who is the wife of a reigning king; or a queen regent, who is the guardian of a child monarch and rules pro tempore in the child's stead, be it  in sharing power or  in ruling alone. She is sometimes called a woman king. A princess regnant is a female monarch who reigns suo jure over a "principality"; an empress regnant is a female monarch who reigns suo jure over an "empire".

A queen regnant possesses and exercises sovereign powers, whereas a queen consort or queen regent shares her spouse's and/or child's rank and titles but does not share the sovereignty of her spouse or child. The husband of a queen regnant traditionally does not share the queen regnant's rank, title, or sovereignty. However, the concept of a king consort or prince consort is not unheard of in both contemporary and classical periods.

A queen dowager or empress dowager is the widow of a king or emperor; a queen mother is a queen dowager who is also the mother of a reigning sovereign.

History 

The oldest attested queen regnant was the Sumerian queen of Kish, Kubaba, who reigned in the later mid-3rd millennium BC, and the Pharaoh Sobekneferu from the 18th/17th century BC.

In Ancient Africa, Ancient Persia, Asian and Pacific cultures, and in some European countries, female monarchs have been given the title king or its equivalent, such as pharaoh, when gender is irrelevant to the office, or else have used the masculine form of the word in languages that have grammatical gender as a way to classify nouns. The Byzantine Empress Irene sometimes titled herself basileus (βασιλεύς), 'emperor', rather than basilissa (βασίλισσα), 'empress', and Mary of Hungary was crowned as Rex Hungariae, King of Hungary in 1382.

Among the Davidic Monarchs of the Kingdom of Judah, there is mentioned a single queen regnant, Athaliah, though the Hebrew Bible regards her negatively as a usurper. The much later Hasmonean Queen Salome Alexandra (Shlom Tzion) was highly popular.

Accession of a queen regnant occurs as a nation's order of succession permits. Methods of succession to kingdoms, tribal chiefships, and such include nomination (the reigning monarch or a council names an heir), primogeniture (in which the children of a monarch or chief have preference in order of birth from eldest to youngest), and ultimogeniture (in which the children have preference in the reverse order of birth from youngest to eldest). The scope of succession may be matrilineal, patrilineal, or both; or, rarely, open to general election when necessary. The right of succession may be open to men and women, or limited to men only or to women only.

The most typical succession in European monarchies from the Late Middle Ages until the late 20th century was male-preference primogeniture: the order of succession ranked the sons of the monarch in order of their birth, followed by the daughters. Historically, many realms, like France, Holy Roman Empire forbade succession by women or through a female line in accordance with the Salic law, and nine countries still do, such countries being Japan, Morocco, Jordan, Saudi Arabia, Bahrain, Brunei, Liechtenstein, Bhutan. No queen regnant ever ruled France, for example. Only one woman, Maria Theresa, ruled Austria. As noted in the list below of widely-known ruling queens, many reigned in European monarchies.

In the late 20th and early 21st centuries, Sweden, Norway, Belgium, the Netherlands, Denmark, Luxembourg and the UK amended their laws of succession to absolute primogeniture (in which the children of a monarch or chief have preference in order of birth from eldest to youngest regardless of gender). In some cases, the change does not take effect during the lifetimes of people already in the line of succession at the time the law was passed.

In 2011, the United Kingdom and the 15 other Commonwealth realms agreed to remove the rule of male-preference primogeniture. Once the necessary legislation was passed, this means that had Prince William had a daughter first, a younger son would not have become heir apparent.

In 2015, Elizabeth II became the longest-reigning queen regnant and female head of state in world history. She was the longest currently serving head of state and longest currently reigning monarch from 2016 until her death on 8 September 2022.

East Asia 
Because there is no feminine equivalent to king and emperor in East Asian languages, different titles are used for female monarchs and female consorts. The titles of female monarchs in East Asia are translated directly as "female king" or "female emperor" and the titles of female consorts in East Asia are translated directly as "king's consort" or "emperor's consort". So, the titles of female monarchs in East Asia are the same as those of male monarchs, just indicating that they are women.

In China, the term nǚhuángdì (女皇帝, "female emperor"), abbreviated as nǚhuáng (女皇), has been used for three empresses regnant to assume the title of huángdì: Daughter of Xiaoming, Chen Shuozhen and Wu Zetian, because the title huánghòu (皇后, "emperor's consort") means only an empress consort. The term nǚwáng (女王, "female king") was also used for queens regnant of Sumpa and it is different from the title wánghòu (王后, "king's consort") which means a queen consort.

In Korea, the term yeowang (여왕, "female king") was developed to refer to three queens regnant of Silla: Seondeok, Jindeok and Jinseong, because the title wangbi (왕비, "king's consort") means only a queen consort. The term yeoje (여제, "female emperor") was also used for Yi Hae-won, the titular empress regnant of Korean Empire because the title hwanghu (황후, "emperor's consort") means only an empress consort.

Although Vietnam is a country in Southeast Asia, it used the royal titles of East Asia. The title as a queen regnant of Trưng Trắc was Nữ vương ("female king") and the title as an empress regnant of Lý Chiêu Hoàng was Nữ hoàng ("female emperor"), and they are different from the titles of female consorts.

In Japan, the title used for two queens regnant of Yamatai: Himiko and Toyo was joō (女王, "female king") and it is different from the title ōhi (王妃, "king's consort") which means only a queen consort. The term josei tennō (女性天皇, "female emperor") has been used for empresses regnant of Japan because the title kōgō (皇后, "emperor's consort") means only an empress consort.

Although the Chrysanthemum Throne of Japan is currently barred to women following the Imperial Household Law (Emperor Naruhito has a daughter, Princess Aiko. She cannot accede to the Chrysanthemum Throne), this has not always been the case; throughout Japanese history, there have been eight empresses regnant. The Japanese imperial succession debate became a significant political issue during the early 2000s, as no male children had been born to the Imperial House of Japan since 1965. Prime Minister Junichirō Koizumi pledged to present parliament with a bill to allow women to ascend the Imperial Throne, but he withdrew this after the birth of Prince Hisahito (Naruhito's nephew) in 2006.

List

See also
 List of women rulers
 Monarch
 List of elected and appointed female heads of state and government
 Order of succession
 Queen consort
 Rani
 Regent
 Salic law
 Sultana
 Women in government
 Matriarchy
 Trưng sisters

Notes

References

Further reading
 ; studies 30 women who exercised full sovereign authority in Europe.

External links

Positions of authority
 
Terms for women
Royal titles
Matriarchy